Farmland Reserve Inc. is an entity owned by The Church of Jesus Christ of Latter-day Saints that serves as both an agricultural investment arm and a resource for the church's food program.

Among its holdings are:

 228,000 acres (923 km2) in Nebraska,; 
 51,600 acres in Osage County, Oklahoma; 
 300,000 acres in Florida comprising the Deseret Ranches

References

Properties of the Church of Jesus Christ of Latter-day Saints